Dara 2013 is the twelfth studio album by Serbian turbo folk singer Dara Bubamara. It was released 19 April 2013 through City Records.

Background
Recording sessions for the album, which took place in Belgrade and Novi Sad, ended in early 2013.

Release and promotion
The album was first released worldwide digitally 19 April 2013, available for purchase on iTunes and Amazon. It became available on CD 30 April 2013.

Bubamara performed several songs from Dara 2013 on the Ami G Show hosted by Ognjen Amidžić on 23 April 2013. Appearing alongside her for the interview was songwriter Marina Tucaković, who penned nine of the album's 15 songs.

Singles
"Galama" was the album's lead single. It was released 26 April 2011. The second single was "Delete", released 25 December 2012.

Track listing

Personnel

Instruments

Ksenija Milošević – backing vocals (1, 5, 6, 11)
Marinko Stambolija – backing vocals (3, 4, 7, 8, 9, 12, 13)
Suzana Dinić – backing vocals (1, 3, 4, 5, 6, 7, 8, 9, 11, 12, 13)
Aleksandar Krsmanović – accordion (1, 5, 6, 11)
Dragan Ivanović – bass (3), guitar/bouzouki (10)
Petar Trumbetaš – guitar/bouzouki (10), bass (1, 5, 6, 11)
Dragan Todorović – guitar, bouzouki, bass (1, 5, 6, 11)
Ivan Mirković – guitar, bouzouki, bass (1, 5, 6, 11)
Kalin Georgiev – kaval (10)
Bojan Vasić – keyboards (3, 10)
Damir Handanović – keyboards (1, 5, 6, 11)

Production and recording

Mr. Beat – arrangement, mixing, mastering (3, 4, 7, 8, 9, 10, 12, 13)
Damir Handanović – programming, editing, producing (1, 5, 6, 11)
Goran Radinović – recording, mixing (1, 5, 6, 11)

References

External links
Dara 2013 at Discogs

2013 albums
City Records albums